Keys to the Kingdom is the sixth studio album by American band North Mississippi Allstars. It was released in 2011 through Songs of the South Records. It features contributions from Mavis Staples, Alvin Youngblood Hart, Spooner Oldham, Gordie Johnson, Ry Cooder, Jim Spake and Jack Ashford. The album peaked at number 175 on the US Current Album Sales, number 46 on the Top Rock Albums, number two on the Top Blues Albums, number 27 on the Independent Albums, number four on the Heatseekers Albums and number 14 on the Tastemakers.

Critical reception 

Keys to the Kingdom was met with generally favorable reviews from music critics. At Metacritic, which assigns a normalized rating out of 100 to reviews from mainstream publications, the album received an average score of 68, based on six reviews.

Doug Collette of All About Jazz found out that the album "hearkens back to The North Mississippi Allstars earliest and rootsiest records, but nevertheless represents a marked advance in maturity". AllMusic's Thom Jurek wrote that it "may have been recorded in response to death and birth but it is, more than anything else, a celebration of all that Jim Dickinson held dear in life and music, which are, after all, the same thing". Katie Chow of American Songwriter resumed: "Keys to the Kingdom is both a tribute to and a continuation of the Dickinson musical tradition". David Fricke of Rolling Stone wrote: "deep roots, improvising valor and live-Cream brawn come easily to this trio. Catching it all in the studio has been harder, like juggling snakes and feral cats. Singer-guitarist Luther Dickinson, his drumming brother, Cody, and bassist Chris Chew come close". 

In a mixed review, Jim Caligiuri of The Austin Chronicle wrote: "more song-oriented than some past Allstars efforts and with an emphasis on country and gospel rather than the trio's gut-bucket blues, it wallops undeniable warmth even when the material itself veers from the Dickinsons' natural strengths".

Track listing

Personnel 
 Cody Dickinson – main performer
 Luther Dickinson – main performer
 Chris Crew – main performer
 Mavis Staples – vocals (track 3)
 Gregory Edward Hart – vocals, harmonica
 Gordie Johnson – guitar (track 2), mixing (tracks: 2, 11)
 Ryland "Ry" Cooder – guitar (track 8)
 Dewey Lindon "Spooner" Oldham – piano
 Jim Spake – saxophone, clarinet
 Jack Ashford – tambourine
 Kevin Houston – recording, mixing
 Ben Tanner – recording
 Jacob Sciba – mixing (tracks: 2, 11)
 Manny A. Sanchez – recording (track 3)
 Martin Pradler – recording (track 8)
 Adam Hill – assistant mixing
 Brad Blackwood – mastering
 Jim Dickinson – liner notes

Charts

References

External links 

2011 albums
North Mississippi Allstars albums